Functional gastrointestinal disorders (FGID), also known as disorders of gut–brain interaction, include a number of separate idiopathic disorders which affect different parts of the gastrointestinal tract and involve visceral hypersensitivity and motility disturbances.

Definition
Using the Delphi method, the Rome Foundation and its board of directors, chairs and co-chairs of the ROME IV committees developed the current definition for disorders of gut-brain interaction.

A group of disorders classified by GI symptoms related to any combination of:
 Motility disturbance
 Visceral hypersensitivity
 Altered mucosal and immune function
 Altered gut microbiota
 Altered central nervous system (CNS) processing

Classification
Terms such as functional colonic disease (or functional bowel disorder) refer in medicine to a group of bowel disorders which are characterized by chronic abdominal complaints without a structural or biochemical cause that could explain symptoms. Other functional disorders relate to other aspects of the process of digestion.

The consensus review process of meetings and publications organised by the Rome Foundation, known as the Rome process, has helped to define the functional gastrointestinal disorders. Successively, the Rome I, Rome II, Rome III and Rome IV proposed consensual classification system and terminology, as recommended by the Rome Coordinating Committee. These now include classifications appropriate for adults, children and neonates/toddlers.

The current ROME IV classification, published in 2016, is as follows:

A. Esophageal disorders
 A1. Functional chest pain
 A2. Functional heartburn
 A3. Reflux hypersensitivity
 A4. Globus
 A5. Functional dysphagia

B. Gastroduodenal disorders
 B1. Functional dyspepsia
 B1a. Postprandial distress syndrome (PDS)
 B1b. Epigastric pain syndrome (EPS)
 B2. Belching disorders
 B2a. Excessive supragastric belching
 B2b. Excessive gastric belching
 B3. Nausea and vomiting disorders
 B3a. Chronic nausea vomiting syndrome (CNVS)
 B3b. Cyclic vomiting syndrome (CVS)
 B3c. Cannabinoid hyperemesis syndrome (CHS)
 B4. Rumination syndrome

C. Bowel disorders
 C1. Irritable bowel syndrome (IBS)
 IBS with predominant constipation (IBS-C)
 IBS with predominant diarrhea (IBS-D)
 IBS with mixed bowel habits (IBS-M)
 IBS unclassified (IBS-U)
 C2. Functional constipation
 C3. Functional diarrhea
 C4. Functional abdominal bloating/distension
 C5. Unspecified functional bowel disorder
 C6. Opioid-induced constipation

D. Centrally mediated disorders of gastrointestinal pain
 D1. Centrally mediated abdominal pain syndrome (CAPS)
 D2. Narcotic bowel syndrome (NBS)/ Opioid-induced GI hyperalgesia

E. Gallbladder and sphincter of Oddi disorders
 E1. Biliary pain
 E1a. Functional gallbladder disorder
 E1b. Functional biliary sphincter of Oddi disorder
 E2. Functional pancreatic sphincter of Oddi disorder

F. Anorectal disorders
 F1. Fecal incontinence
 F2. Functional anorectal pain
 F2a. Levator ani syndrome
 F2b. Unspecified functional anorectal pain
 F2c. Proctalgia fugax
 F3. Functional defecation disorders
 F3a. Inadequate defecatory propulsion
 F3b. Dyssynergic defecation

G. Childhood functional GI disorders: Neonate/Toddler
 G1. Infant regurgitation
 G2. Rumination syndrome
 G3. Cyclic vomiting syndrome (CVS)
 G4. Infant colic
 G5. Functional diarrhea
 G6. Infant dyschezia
 G7. Functional constipation

H. Childhood functional GI disorders: Child/Adolescent
 H1. Functional nausea and vomiting disorders
 H1a. Cyclic vomiting syndrome (CVS)
 H1b. Functional nausea and functional vomiting
 H1b1. Functional nausea
 H1b2. Functional vomiting
 H1c. Rumination syndrome
 H1d. Aerophagia
 H2. Functional abdominal pain disorders
 H2a. Functional dyspepsia
 H2a1. Postprandial distress syndrome
 H2a2. Epigastric pain syndrome
 H2b. Irritable bowel syndrome (IBS)
 H2c. Abdominal migraine
 H2d. Functional abdominal pain ‒ NOS
 H3. Functional defecation disorders
 H3a. Functional constipation
 H3b. Nonretentive fecal incontinence

Causes
FGIDs share in common any of several physiological features including increased motor reactivity, enhanced visceral hypersensitivity, altered mucosal immune and inflammatory function (associated with bacterial dysbiosis), and altered central nervous system and enteric nervous system (CNS-ENS) regulation.

The pathophysiology of FGID has been best conceptualized using biopsychosocial model help to explain the relationships between an individual factors in their early life that in turn can influence their psychosocial factor and physiological functioning. This model also shows the complex interactions between these factors through the brain-gut axis. These factors affect how FGID manifest in terms of symptoms but also affect the clinical outcome. These factors are interconnected and the influences on these factors are bidirectional and mutually interactive.

Early life factors
Early life factors include genetic factors, psychophysiological and sociocultural factors, and environmental exposures.
 Genetics – Several polymorphisms and candidate genes may predispose individuals to develop FGID.  These include alpha-2 adrenergic and 5-HT receptors; serotonin and norepinephrine transporters (SERT, NET); inflammatory markers interleukin-(IL)10, tumor necrosis factor-(TNF) alpha, and TNF super family member 15 (TNF-SF15); intracellular cell signaling (G proteins); and ion channels (SCN5A). However, the expression of a FGID requires the influence of additional environmental exposures such as infection, illness modeling and other factors.
 Psychophysiological factors may affect the expression of these genes, thus leading to symptoms production associated with FGID.
 Sociocultural factors and family interactions have been shown to shape later reporting of symptoms, the development of FGIDs, and health care seeking. The expression of pain varies across cultures as well including denial of symptoms to dramatic expression.
 Environmental exposures  – Prior studies have shown the effect of environmental exposures in relation to the development of FGIDs. Environmental exposures such as childhood salmonella infection can be a risk factor for IBS in adulthood.

Psychosocial factors
Psychosocial factors influence the functioning of the GI tract through the brain-gut axis (motility, sensitivity, barrier function). They also affect experience and behavior, treatment selection and the clinical outcome. Psychological stress or one's emotional response to stress exacerbates gastrointestinal symptoms and may contribute to FGID development.

Physiology
The physiology of FGID is characterized by abnormal motility, visceral hypersensitivity as well as dysregulation of the immune system and barrier function of the GI tract as well as inflammatory changes.
 Abnormal motility  Studies have shown altered muscle contractility and tone, bowel compliance, and transit may contribute to many of the gastrointestinal symptoms of FGID which may include diarrhea, constipation, and vomiting.
 Visceral hypersensitivity  In FGID there is poor association of pain with GI motility in many functional GI disorders. These patient often have a lower pain threshold with balloon distension of the bowel (visceral hyperalgesia), or they have increased sensitivity even to normal intestinal function; Visceral hypersensitivity may be amplified in patients with FGIDs.
 Immune dysregulation, inflammation, and barrier dysfunction  Studies on postinfectious IBS have shown that factors such as mucosal membrane permeability, the intestinal flora, and altered mucosal immune function. Ultimately leading to visceral hypersensitivity. Factors contributing to this occurrence include genetics, psychological stress, and altered receptor sensitivity at the gut mucosa and myenteric plexus, which are enabled by mucosal immune dysfunction.
 Microbiome  There has been increased attention to the role of bacteria and the microbiome in overall health and disease.  There is evidence for a group of microorganisms which play a role in the brain-gut axis. Studies have revealed that the bacterial composition of the gastrointestinal tract in IBS patient differs from healthy individuals (e.g., increased Firmicutes and reduced Bacteroidetes and Bifidobacteria) However, further research is needed to determine the role of the microbiome in FGIDs.
 Food and diet The types of food consumed and diet consumed plays a role in the manifestation of FGID and also their relationship to intestinal microbiota. Studies have shown that specific changes in diet  (e.g., low FODMAP—fermentable oligo-, di-, and monosaccharides and polyols, or gluten restriction in some patients) may help and reduce the symptom burden in FGID. However, no one diet has been shown to be recommended for all people.

Brain-gut axis
The brain-gut axis is the mechanism in which the psychosocial factors influence the GI tract and vice versa. There is communication between emotional and cognitive centers of the brain to the GI tract and vice versa. Emotions have been shown to stimulate colon motor function and result in decreased colonic transit time, increased contractile activity, the induction of defecation, and symptoms of diarrhea.

Epidemiology
Functional gastrointestinal disorders are very common. Globally, irritable bowel syndrome and functional dyspepsia alone may affect 16–26% of the population.

Research
There is considerable research into the causes, diagnosis and treatments for FGIDs. Diet, microbiome, genetics, neuromuscular function and immunological response all interact. A role for mast cell activation has been proposed as one of the factors.

See also
 Allergy
 Food intolerance
 Functional indigestion
 Histamine intolerance

References

External links 

Gastrointestinal tract disorders